Football was contested in the 2013 Summer Deaflympics from July 26 to August 4. Riu Resort and Spa Pravets were selected to host the football matches. Russia defeated Ukraine to claim the gold medal. Germany placed third.

Group stage

Pool A

Pool B

Pool C

Pool D

Knockout stage

13th-16th places

9th-12th places

Quarterfinals
<onlyinclude>

5th-8th places

Rankings

References 

2013 in association football
International association football competitions hosted by Bulgaria
2013 Summer Deaflympics
2013–14 in Bulgarian football